Dick Lowe is an American politician serving as a member of the Oklahoma House of Representatives from the 56th district. He assumed office on November 18, 2020.

Education 
After graduating from Ninnekah High School, Lowe earned a Bachelor of Science degree in animal science from Oklahoma State University–Stillwater and a Master of Arts degree in educational leadership and administration from Southern Nazarene University.

Career 
Since 2008, Lowe has worked as an agricultural instructor at the Canadian Valley Technology Center. He was elected to the Oklahoma House of Representatives in November 2018. He also serves as vice chair of the House A&B Education Committee.

References 

Living people
Republican Party members of the Oklahoma House of Representatives
Oklahoma State University alumni
Southern Nazarene University alumni
People from Grady County, Oklahoma
Year of birth missing (living people)